Hakuyo Maru may refer to the following ships:
 , World War II-era Japanese survey ship
 , World War II-era Japanese submarine chaser
 , World War II-era Japanese cargo ship
 , World War II-era Japanese cargo ship
 , World War II-era Japanese transport ship

Japanese Navy ship names
Imperial Japanese Navy ship names